Agdal is a historical concept in Morocco, referring to government-owned or private gardens.

Agdal may also refer to:


Morocco 
 Agdal (Rabat), an urban community in Rabat, Morocco
 Agdal Gardens, a garden area in Marrakech, Morocco
 Agdal, an urban community in Fez, Morocco
 Agdal, an urban community in Meknes, Morocco

India 
 Agdal, Rewa, a village in India

Other 
 Nina Agdal (born 1992), Danish model

See also
 Agda (disambiguation)